Bathyxylophila pusilla is a species of sea snail, a marine gastropod mollusk in the family Larocheidae.

Distribution
This species occurs in the bathyal zone off New Zealand.

References

External links
 To World Register of Marine Species

Larocheidae
Gastropods described in 1988